Friedrich Carl Alwin Pockels (18 June 1865 – 29 August 1913) was a German physicist.  He was born in Italy to Captain Theodore Pockels and Alwine Becker.  He obtained a doctorate from the University of Göttingen in 1888, and from 1900 to 1913 he was professor of theoretical physics at the University of Heidelberg.

In 1893 he discovered that a steady electric field applied to certain birefringent materials causes the refractive index to vary, approximately in proportion to the strength of the field. This phenomenon is now called the Pockels effect.

His sister Agnes Pockels (1862–1935) was a pioneer in chemistry.

See also
Photoelasticity

19th-century German physicists
1865 births
1913 deaths
Technical University of Braunschweig alumni
University of Göttingen alumni
Academic staff of Heidelberg University
20th-century German physicists